Carlos Etheredge (born August 10, 1970) is a former American football tight end. He played for the Indianapolis Colts in 1994.

References

1970 births
Living people
Players of American football from Albuquerque, New Mexico
American football tight ends
Miami Hurricanes football players
Indianapolis Colts players
Amsterdam Admirals players
American expatriate sportspeople in the Netherlands